Moksen bin Mohammad is a Bruneian former international footballer and current coach. He previously played for the Brunei national representative team in the M-League as a forward.

Playing and coaching career
Moksen represented Brunei in the Malaysian league from 1992 until 1999, he played sparingly for the Wasps as he was often overlooked for Rosanan Samak, Suni Mat Jerah, Said Abdullah as well as the prolific import duo of Brian Bothwell and Raphael Patron Akakpo. Moksen retired from the team after winning the 1999 Malaysia Cup, one of seven players to do so.

Moksen soon took up coaching and steered Kasuka FC to becoming district league champions in 2000, as well as beating a very young DPMM FC to domestic silverware the following year. This did not go unnoticed with his former coach Mick Jones who made Moksen his assistant in 2001.

Moksen coached the Brunei under-20s at the 2005 AFF U-20 Youth Championship held in Indonesia. His next assignment was for the national team at the 2008 AFC Challenge Cup qualification matches held in the Philippines as assistant to Kwon Oh-son. He then briefly coached NBT FC in 2008 and Indera SC in 2011, and was back with Kwon for the locally-held 2012 Hassanal Bolkiah Trophy which Brunei won.

Moksen was installed by Brunei DPMM FC as assistant coach to the arriving Steve Kean in November 2013, and has been in that position since. Moksen also became assistant coach for the Brunei national team once again, when Kwon was reassigned as Brunei head coach in October 2016.

International career

Moksen appeared for the Brunei national team as hosts at the 20th SEA Games, playing all four games as Brunei failed to advance to the semi-finals. He appeared alongside Jefry and Irwan in three of the four games.

Honours

Player
Brunei M-League Team
Malaysia Cup: 1999

Coach
Kasuka FC
Brunei-Muara District League Division 3: 2000
Pengiran Sengamara Di Raja Cup: 2000
Pepsi Cup: 2001
Brunei U21 (assistant)
Hassanal Bolkiah Trophy: 2012
DPMM FC (assistant)
Singapore League Cup: 2014
S.League: 2015

Individual
 Order of Setia Negara Brunei Fourth Class (PSB) (2012)
  Meritorius Service Medal (PJK) (1999, 2012)

Personal life

He is the brother of fellow Bruneian internationals Jefry and Irwan, as well as Sufri who he had coached at Kasuka FC. He is unrelated to his contemporary Martilu Mohamed.

References 

1971 births
Living people
Association football forwards
Bruneian footballers
Brunei international footballers
Bruneian football managers
Brunei (Malaysia Premier League team) players
Competitors at the 1999 Southeast Asian Games
Southeast Asian Games competitors for Brunei